Nye is an unincorporated community in Umatilla County, Oregon, United States.

Nye was named for A. W. Nye, an early resident of Umatilla County. Nye post office ran from 1887 through 1917.

See also
Nolin, Oregon

References

Unincorporated communities in Umatilla County, Oregon
1887 establishments in Oregon
Populated places established in 1887
Unincorporated communities in Oregon